FRW may refer to:

FRW, currency symbol for the Rwandan franc
 FRW metric, one name for an exact solution of Einstein's field equations of general relativity
 Federation of Rural Workers, a former Irish trade union
 Friction welding, a solid-state welding process
 Front Row Wrestling, an American wrestling promotion
 FRW, station code for the Fairwater railway station, Cardiff, Wales
 FRW, SAME code for a fire warning in the United States
 FRW, IATA airport code for Francistown Airport, Botswana
 FRW, IATA airline designator for the defunct Bechuanaland National Airways based in Francistown